King of New York is a 1990 neo-noir gangster film directed by Abel Ferrara and written by Nicholas St. John. It stars Christopher Walken as a New York City drug kingpin rebuilding his criminal empire after his release from prison, while also attempting to go legitimate. Laurence Fishburne, David Caruso, Victor Argo and Wesley Snipes co-star, with supporting roles played by Giancarlo Esposito, Steve Buscemi, Paul Calderón, Janet Julian and Theresa Randle. It was released by Carolco Pictures (through New Line Cinema) on September 22, 1990, to generally positive reviews.

Plot
Frank White, a drug lord, strives to control New York City's criminal underground. Shortly after his release from prison, White and his crew, led by his trigger-happy right-hand man Jimmy Jump, consolidate power by eliminating their rivals in the Colombian drug cartel and Triad. White personally executes a Mafia boss who refuses to cooperate with him.

White's exploits catch the attention of the NYPD's narcotics squad. Detectives Bishop, Gilley and Flanigan confront White but lack any tangible evidence to arrest him. They instead turn their attention to White's henchmen, whom they arrest after a surviving member of the Colombian drug cartel agrees to cooperate with the police. 

White's lawyers intervene and free the men from jail. Gilley and Flanigan are frustrated and lead a clandestine operation to take down White and his crew. They storm a night club where White is partying and kill many of his men. White and Jump survive the raid but are chased by Gilley and Flanigan. Jump ambushes and mortally wounds Flanigan. Gilley is unable to resuscitate his partner, and executes Jump in a fit of rage.

A grief-stricken Gilley attends Flanigan's funeral, where he is abruptly murdered by White in a drive-by shooting. White then confronts detective Bishop in his own apartment. He holds him at gunpoint while explaining he eliminated the Colombian drug cartel and Triad in New York City because he disapproved of their involvement in human trafficking and child prostitution. White restrains Bishop to a chair and leaves.

Bishop escapes his restraints and chases White into the subway. Both men draw guns on each other but White uses an innocent bystander as a human-shield. The two exchange gunfire and Bishop is killed. White exits the subway and makes his way to a taxi in Times Square. He clutches a gunshot wound on his chest and watches as police surround his taxi. White goes limp and dies as the police close in on him.

Cast

Production
King of New York was shot entirely in and around New York City. According to Abel Ferrara, then-owner Donald Trump gave him permission to film at the Plaza Hotel at no charge, on the condition that Walken would pose for a photograph with Ivana Trump, who was a fan of the actor. Filming locations included Sing Sing, the Plaza Hotel, Times Square, Times Square–42nd Street/Port Authority Bus, Terminal station, Williamsburg, Queensboro Bridge, Fifth Avenuel Ossining, and Saranac Lake.

Release

Home media 
King of New York was released on a 2-Disc Special Edition DVD on April 20, 2004. The film was released on Blu-ray on October 23, 2007.

Reception

Critical response
The film holds a 70% approval rating on Rotten Tomatoes, based on 30 reviews. The website's consensus reads, "King of New York covers familiar narrative ground with impressive style -- and leaves plenty of room for its talented cast to deliver gripping performances." On Metacritic the film has a score of 66% based on reviews from 20 critics, indicating "generally favorable reviews".

Total Film rated King of New York four stars out of five. Roger Ebert awarded two stars out of four, citing Walken's "usual polished and somehow sinister ease" and the director's strong command of mood and style, marred by a sketchy screenplay and a fragmented plot. Mark Caro, writing for the Chicago Tribune, gave the movie only 1/2 star. He called King of New York "a film that sucked like mad", adding that star Christopher Walken and the movie remain "just out of grasp". 
The film was also featured in Steven Jay Schneider's 7th Edition of 1001 Movies You Must See Before You Die.

Bojan Bazelli was nominated for an Independent Spirit Award for Best Cinematography.

References

External links

 
 

1990 films
1990 crime thriller films
1990 independent films
1990s English-language films
American crime thriller films
American neo-noir films
Carolco Pictures films
Films about the American Mafia
Films about the illegal drug trade
Films about the New York City Police Department
Films directed by Abel Ferrara
Films scored by Joe Delia
Films set in New York City
Italian gangster films
English-language Italian films
Italian crime thriller films
1990s American films